Badajoz railway station  is the central railway station of Badajoz, Spain. Commonly referred locally as the RENFE station, the station is part of Adif and high-speed rail systems: it is located at the western part of the Southwest–Portuguese high speed line.

Railway service 
The station accommodates RENFE long-distance and medium-distance trains (AVE). It is part of the proposed Madrid–Lisbon high-speed rail line, the first (resp. last) Spanish railway station after (resp. before) the Portugal part.

In August 2017 Comboios de Portugal (CP), the Portuguese national railway company, restarted an international passenger train service to/from Portugal. A daily return service links Badajoz with Entroncamento, with connections to Lisbon and Porto.

References 

Buildings and structures in Badajoz
Railway stations in Spain
Transport in Extremadura